Kyarda Hanumanji Temple is a type of temple in the city of Hindaun in Rajasthan, India. It is famous Temple. Every year Pad Yatra come heare. Is stated on SH-22 in Kyarda, Hindaun.

Temples in Rajasthan
Hindaun